Charles Swan (date of birth unknown) is a former Bermudian cricketer. Swan's batting and bowling styles are unknown.

Swan made his debut for Bermuda in a List A match against Trinidad and Tobago in the 1998–99 Red Stripe Bowl, and made two further List A appearances in that tournament against the Windward Islands and Guyana. He scored four runs in his three List A matches, and bowled eighteen wicketless overs.

References

External links
Charles Swan at ESPNcricinfo
Charles Swan at CricketArchive

Living people
Bermudian cricketers
Year of birth missing (living people)